Jüchen is a municipality in the Rhein-Kreis Neuss, in North Rhine-Westphalia, Germany. It is situated approximately 17 km southwest of Neuss and 10 km southeast of Mönchengladbach.

Mayor
Harald Zillikens (* 1959) (CDU) was elected mayor in 2009 and reelected in 2015 and 2020. He was the successor of Margarete Kranz (CDU).

Twin towns – sister cities

Jüchen is twinned with:
 Leers, France

Notable people
 Fritz von Ameln (1901–1970), management consultant, member of the Düsseldorf Landtag (1954–1966)
 Peter Bamm, actually Curt Emmrich, (1897–1975), writer
 Heinrich Siegmund Blanckertz (1823–Berlin), founder of the German steel spring industry
 Willibert Kremer (born 1939), football player and manager
 Annette Schavan (born 1955), politician (CDU), 2005-2013 Federal Minister for Education and Research
 Willy Wimmer (born 1943), politician (CDU)
 Dietrich Zillessen (born 1937), Professor of Religious Education at the University of Cologne

References

Rhein-Kreis Neuss